Jordan Domínguez Rajo (born 31 January 1995) is a Spanish professional footballer who plays as an attacking midfielder for Spanish Segunda División RFEF club SD Compostela.

Career
Born in Salvaterra de Miño, Domínguez joined the youth academy of Celta de Vigo at the age of 12. After progressing through the youth ranks, he was  promoted to the reserve team (playing in Segunda División B) in 2013. However, an injury restricted his playing time during the 2013–14 season. At the end of the 2015–16 season, he rejected a contract extension and instead joined fellow league club CD Toledo on 19 July 2016.

On 23 August 2017, Domínguez moved to Real Murcia of the same tier. On 24 September, he made his debut, coming on as a 45th minute substitute for Juanma Bravo in a 1–1 draw against CF Villanovense.

On 3 August 2018, Domínguez moved abroad and joined Finnish club Helsingin Jalkapalloklubi for the remainder of the season. He left the club again at the end of the season.

On 30 January 2019, Domínguez returned to Spain and joined UB Conquense in the third tier.

Career statistics

Honours
HJK
Veikkausliiga: 2018

References

External links

1995 births
Living people
Association football midfielders
Spanish footballers
Segunda División B players
Celta de Vigo B players
CD Toledo players
Niki Volos F.C. players 
Real Murcia players
UB Conquense footballers
Veikkausliiga players
Helsingin Jalkapalloklubi players
Spanish expatriate footballers
Spanish expatriate sportspeople in Finland